This is a list of electricity-generating power stations in Idaho, sorted by type and name. In 2020, Idaho had a total summer capacity of 5,213 MW through all of its power plants, and a net generation of 17,686 GWh. The corresponding electrical energy generation mix in 2021 was 50.9% hydroelectric, 26% natural gas, 15.6% wind, 3% biomass, 4% solar, and 0.4% geothermal.

During 2021, Idaho was one of the top-five U.S. states in its share of renewable electricity generation. It has a rapidly growing population and many undeveloped resources. Idahoans have consumed about 50% more electricity during recent years than is generated within the state.

Fossil-fuel power stations
Data from the U.S. Energy Information Administration serves as a general reference.

Coal-fired

Natural gas-fired
Idaho has few natural gas reserves, and most of the supply is imported.   There were just eight producing wells in the state in 2019.

 The Nampa plant was opened 1948 and originally coal-fired before it was converted to gas in 2015.

Petroleum-fired

Renewable power stations
Data from the U.S. Energy Information Administration serves as a general reference.

Biomass and Industrial Waste 

 Waste heat from phosphate fertilizer manufacturing.

Geothermal

Hydroelectric

 Electricity is generated in Oregon.

Wind

Solar

Storage power stations
Idaho had no utility-scale storage facilities in 2019.

Nuclear (R&D Only)
Since 1951, fifty-two reactors have been built on the grounds of the Atomic Energy Commission's National Reactor Testing Station, currently the location of the U.S. Department of Energy's Idaho National Laboratory (INL).  BORAX-III was the first nuclear reactor to supply electrical power to the U.S. grid in 1955.  Four reactors which do not generate electricity are in operation at the site as of year 2020.

References

Lists of buildings and structures in Idaho
 
Idaho